Aucuba chinensis is a shrub or small tree, native to southern China, Taiwan, Burma and northern Vietnam. Typically it grows to 6 meters tall, though it can be larger. The leaves are thick, dark green above and light green below, sometimes with teeth along the margins.

References

Flora of China

Garryales
Flora of Myanmar
Flora of China
Flora of Taiwan
Flora of Vietnam